Jeff Kowalick (22 July 1946 – 28 February 2018) was an Australian cricketer. He played in one first-class match for South Australia in 1966/67. He later became a cricket coach.

See also
 List of South Australian representative cricketers

References

External links
 

1946 births
2018 deaths
Australian cricketers
South Australia cricketers
Cricketers from Adelaide